Franck is a small lunar impact crater that lies near the north end of Sinus Amoris, a bay on the northern part of Mare Tranquillitatis. Its diameter is 12 km. It was named after German physicist and Nobel laureate James Franck. The crater lies just to the southeast of Brewster, and farther to the south of Römer. Franck was previously designated Römer K.

This is a circular, bowl-shaped crater with a sharp rim that has not been significantly eroded. The interior walls slope down to the tiny floor at the midpoint. Just to the north of Franck is a joined pair of smaller craters, and the three nearly form a merged cluster of impacts.

References

External links
 LTO-43D2 Franck — L&PI topographic map

Impact craters on the Moon